Sambassadeur are a Swedish pop band formed in 2003 in Gothenburg. They are named after the Serge Gainsbourg song "Les Sambassadeurs." The band are signed to the Labrador label, and to date, they have released four studio albums and a handful of EPs and singles. Their third album, European, was released in February 2010.

Discography

Studio albums

Singles & EPs
"Ice & Snow"/"There You Go" single (2004)
Between the Lines (LAB069, 20 April 2005)
New Moon (LAB070, 4 May 2005)
Coastal Affairs (LAB087, 3 May 2006)
"Final Say"/"Crooked Spine" single (LAB112, 23 January 2008)
"Days" single (digital, 1 February 2010)
"I Can Try" single (digital, 14 July 2010)
"Memories"/"Hours Away" single (LAB144V, 23 November 2012)
"Foot of Afrikka" single (digital, 1 February 2019)
"Stuck"/"Stuck Azure Blue Remix" (digital, 8 March 2019)

References

External links
 

Swedish indie rock groups
Swedish indie pop groups
Dream pop musical groups
Musical groups established in 2003